Walter Wade may refer to:

Walter Wade (botanist), Irish physician and botanist
Walter Wade (bishop), suffragan bishop of the Anglican Diocese of Cape Town, 1970–76
Walter Ross Wade, American physician and planter
Walter Wade, a character in the 2000 film Shaft

See also
Walter Wade Robinson, Anglican priest